The 1994 Asian Badminton Championships was the 13th edition of the Badminton Asia Championships. It was held in Shanghai Gymnasium, Shanghai, China, from April 6 to April 10. Except the Men's singles discipline which was won by Malaysia; China won all the titles.

Medalists

Medal table

Final Results

Men's singles

Women's singles

Men's doubles

Women's doubles

Mixed doubles

See also
 Medalists at the Badminton Asia Championships

References 

Badminton Asia Championships
Asian Badminton Championships
1994 Asian Badminton Championships
Badminton Asia Championships
Badminton Asia Championships